Baron Islington, of Islington in the County of London, was a title in the Peerage of the United Kingdom. It was created in 1910 for Sir John Poynder-Dickson, 6th Baronet, Governor of New Zealand from 1910 to 1912.

The Baronetcy, of Hardingham Hall in the County of Norfolk, was created in the Baronetage of the United Kingdom on 21 September 1802 for Archibald Dickson, an admiral in the Royal Navy, with remainder, in default of male issue of his own, to his nephew Archibald Collingwood Dickson and the male issue of his body.

Dickson had no sons and was succeeded according to the special remainder by his nephew, the second Baronet. He was the son of Admiral William Dickson. The second Baronet was a rear-admiral in the Royal Navy. He was succeeded by his eldest son, the third Baronet. He was a vice-admiral in the Royal Navy. He was childless and was succeeded by his younger brother, the fourth Baronet. He was a colonel in the Bengal Army. He was succeeded by his younger brother, the fifth Baronet. He was a captain in the Royal Navy. He was childless and was succeeded by his nephew, the aforementioned sixth Baronet who was elevated to the peerage in 1910. He was the only son of John Bourmaster Dickson (1815-1876), a rear-admiral in the Royal Navy and the fifth son of the second Baronet, by his first wife Sarah Matilda (d. 1863), daughter of Thomas Poynder, of Hilmarton near Calne, Wiltshire. In 1888, on succeeding to the estates of his maternal uncle, he assumed by Royal licence the additional surname of Poynder. The titles became extinct on Lord Islington's death in 1936.

The first Baronet was the nephew of James Dickson, Member of Parliament for Lanark Burghs and the brother of the aforementioned William Dickson (d. 1803), an admiral in the Royal Navy.

Dickson, later Poynder Dickson baronets, of Hardingham Hall (1802)
Sir Archibald Dickson, 1st Baronet (died 1803) 
Sir Archibald Collingwood Dickson, 2nd Baronet (1772–1827) 
Sir William Dickson, 3rd Baronet (1798–1868) 
Sir Colpoys Dickson, 4th Baronet (1807–1868) 
Sir Alexander Collingwood Thomas Dickson, 5th Baronet (1810–1884) 
Sir John Poynder Dickson, 6th Baronet (1866–1936) (created Baron Islington in 1910)

Barons Islington (1910)
John Poynder Dickson, 1st Baron Islington (1866–1936)

References

Book cited

Extinct baronies in the Peerage of the United Kingdom
Noble titles created in 1910
Noble titles created for UK MPs